James Dow Constantine (born November 15, 1961) is an American politician, lawyer, and urban planner in the state of Washington who is serving his third term as King County Executive, an office he has held since November 2009. He was in the state legislature and on the King County Council, chairing the latter before his election as executive. Constantine is a self-identified Democrat, though the executive's office is officially nonpartisan. He considered running for governor of Washington in the 2020 election but decided against it when incumbent Jay Inslee decided to seek a third term.

Early life and education
The son of John and Lois Constantine, he was born and raised in West Seattle. In 1980, he graduated from West Seattle High School, where he was student body president and an Eagle Scout. He attended the University of Washington (UW), receiving a Bachelor of Arts in political science and graduated as a member of the Phi Kappa Sigma fraternity. Constantine also served an internship with Washington's 34th Legislative District representative Phil Talmadge. While attending law school, Constantine worked as a disk jockey for the college radio station KCMU. In 1989, Constantine earned a J.D. degree from the University of Washington School of Law. Constantine later returned to obtain a Master's degree in urban planning from UW in 1992.

Career
Constantine opened a private law practice in 1990. He served as chair of the 34th District Democrats organization and worked as an aide for King County Council member Greg Nickels. Constantine was elected to the State House of Representatives in 1996. He won re-election in 1998. In 2001, he became a Washington State Senator. He left the state senate in 2002 after being appointed to the King County Council to replace Nickels, who had been elected Seattle mayor. Constantine was a King County Council member from 2002 to 2009, representing the eighth district, which includes West Seattle, parts of Southeast Seattle, North Highline, Burien, Vashon Island, Maury Island, Normandy Park, and parts of both SeaTac and Tukwila. In 2009, he served as council Chair.

King County Executive
Constantine announced his candidacy for King County Executive on February 16, 2009 to replace Ron Sims who was appointed the United States Deputy Secretary of Housing and Urban Development. In the primary election, Constantine received 22% of the votes to advance to a run off against candidate Susan Hutchison, who received 37%. Described as "perhaps the most contentious race on the November [2009] ballot" by Seattle NPR outlet KPLU, the campaign has been characterized by negative campaigning, including "mudslinging" ads paid for by the candidates' supporters.

Constantine received press attention for stressing the conservative affiliations of Hutchison, pointing to her involvement with the Discovery Institute and contributions to Republican candidates such as President Bush in 2004 and Mike Huckabee in 2008. Hutchison downplayed any perceived partisanship and criticized Constantine as a political insider with close ties to labor unions.

In October 2009, the Washington State Public Disclosure Commission (PDC) investigated allegations that the Constantine's campaign illegally coordinated with an independent campaign on anti-Hutchison ads. The PDC concluded there was no coordination and dismissed the complaint. The PDC also investigated complaints regarding Hutchison's campaign on allegations that campaign contributions exceeded single election limits and that expenditures by the campaign were not properly documented. The PDC imposed a $100 fine against Hutchison for exceeding campaign limits and dismissed the failure-to-report allegations.

Constantine was endorsed by Governor Christine Gregoire, Seattle Mayor Greg Nickels, US Senators Patty Murray and Maria Cantwell, Washington State Senate Majority Leader Lisa Brown as well as state Senators Ed Murray, Ken Jacobsen, Joe McDermott, and Karen Keiser. Organizations that endorsed Constantine included NARAL Pro-Choice Washington, the Sierra Club, the Cascade Bicycle Club, International Association of Machinists and Aerospace Workers and the UFCW.

On election night, November 3, the initial batch of election results had Constantine winning the election over Hutchison, at that time receiving 57% of the votes to her 43%. He was expected to replace interim Executive Kurt Triplett on November 24 following the certification of election results by the King County Elections' Canvassing Board. Constantine was ultimately declared the winner, and was inaugurated November 24, 2009.

Potential gubernatorial campaign

In early 2019, Constantine was frequently mentioned as a possible candidate for Governor of Washington in the 2020 election. Two-term incumbent Jay Inslee was constitutionally eligible for to run for a third term but had opted to mount a campaign for President of the United States in the 2020 election instead, leaving the Governor's Office open. Several Democrats expressed interest in running should it be an open election but did not want to challenge Inslee should he change his mind. Facing poor polling numbers, Inslee decided to suspend his presidential campaign on August 21 and announced the next day he would indeed seek a third term as governor. Constantine, along with several other potential candidates, released a statement that he would not be running in 2020 and would instead focus on his own 2021 reelection campaign.

Personal life
Constantine married his long-time partner Shirley Carlson in a private ceremony on October 31, 2013. The couple met while working at the University of Washington radio station. They live in North Admiral, Seattle.

References

External links

Official King County homepage
Campaign website

King County Councillors
Democratic Party members of the Washington House of Representatives
Democratic Party Washington (state) state senators
Living people
1961 births
Politicians from Seattle
University of Washington College of Arts and Sciences alumni
University of Washington School of Law alumni
West Seattle High School alumni